

References

C